Hypochlorosis lorquinii is a butterfly in the family Lycaenidae. It is found on Maluku and Fergusson Island.

Subspecies
H. l. lorquinii (Indonesia, Maluku, Aru, Halmahera)
H. l. buruana Holland, 1900 (Buru)
H. l. obiana (Fruhstorfer, 1908) (Obi)

References

, 1977. Butterflies of the Australian Region, edn 2. 415 pp. Melbourne.
, 1865–75. Rhopalocera. In Reise der Osterreichischen Fregatte Novara um die Erde in der Jahren 1857, 1858, 1859 under den Befehlen Commadore B. von Wüllerstorf-Urbair. Zoologischer Theil. Zweiter Band: Abtheilung. Vienna, 549 pp., 140 pls.
, 1908. Neue Lycaeniden des Papua-Gebeits. Internationale Entomologische Zeitschrift 2(18): 114. 
, 1916. Gross-Schmetterlinge der Erde. Die Indo-Australischen Tagfalter. Vol. 9. Stuttgart.
, 1900. The Lepidoptera of Buru. Part 1: Rhopalocera. Novitates Zoologicae 7:54-85.
, 1998. The Butterflies of Papua New Guinea Academic Press, 

Butterflies described in 1865
Theclinae
Taxa named by Baron Cajetan von Felder
Taxa named by Rudolf Felder